The canton of Sorbiers is an administrative division of the Loire department, in eastern France. It was created at the French canton reorganisation which came into effect in March 2015. Its seat is in Sorbiers.

It consists of the following communes: 

Cellieu
Chagnon 
L'Étrat 
Fontanès 
La Fouillouse 
Marcenod 
Saint-Christo-en-Jarez 
Saint-Héand 
Saint-Romain-en-Jarez 
Sorbiers 
La Talaudière 
La Tour-en-Jarez 
Valfleury

References

Cantons of Loire (department)